Sara Di Filippo is an Italian football midfielder, currently playing for UPC Tavagnacco in Serie A. She has been a member of the Italian national team, playing the  2005 European Championship.

References

1982 births
Living people
Italian women's footballers
Italy women's international footballers
Sportspeople from Udine
Women's association football midfielders
U.P.C. Tavagnacco players
Serie A (women's football) managers
Footballers from Friuli Venezia Giulia